The 2013 season is Alianza Lima's 112th in existence and the club's 96th season in the top flight of Peruvian football. The season marks the return of manager Wilmar Valencia, who assumed management of the club first in 2005.

Season overview

Players

Squad information

Transfers

In

Out
{| class="wikitable sortable"
|-
! style="width:120px;"| Date
! style="width:30px;"| 
! style="width:185px;"| Player
! style="width:25px;"| 
! style="width:150px;"| Moving to
! style="width:120px;" class="unsortable"| Fee
! style="width:250px;" class="unsortable"| Notes
|-
| 
| align=center| 
|  
| 
| Retired
| align=center| Free
| align=center| 
|-	
| 
| align=center| 
|  
| 
|  Univ. César Vallejo
| align=center|  Free
| align=center| 
|-
| 
| align=center| 
|  
| 
|  Hoffenheim
| align=center| 
| align=center| 
|-
| 
| align=center| 
|  
| 
| Released
| align=center| Free
| align=center| 
|-
| 
| align=center| 
|  
| 
|  Inti Gas
| align=center| Loan
| align=center| 
|-
| 
| align=center| 
|  
| 
|  Juan Aurich
| align=center| Free
| align=center| 
|-	
| 
| align=center| 
|  
| 
|  Unión Comercio
| align=center|  Free
| align=center| 
|-	
| 
| align=center| 
|  
| 
|  León de Huánuco
| align=center|  Free
| align=center| 
|-
| 
| align=center| 
|  
| 
|  UTC
| align=center| Free
| align=center| 
|-

Competitions

Overall

Torneo Descentralizado

Results by round

Matches
Kickoff times are in CET.

References

Peruvian football clubs 2013 season
Alianza Lima seasons